Alberto António Monteiro (18 July 1928 – 20 October 2015), known as Fialho, is a former Portuguese footballer who played as a forward.

Career
Born in Cape Verde, Fialho began his career at Bissau e Benfica, a club associated with Benfica. In 1953, the 25-year old signed with Benfica and made his first appearance on 4 October of the same year, in a 2–0 win over Lusitano de Évora.

With strong competition from Arsenio Duarte, José Águas and Rogério Pipi, his playing time was restricted, but he still appeared in 18 games during his first year and 17 in his second, winning the league title in the latter. After just game in 1955–56, he departed the club to play for Lusitano de Èvora.

He spent six years in Lusitano, with mild success. After retiring, he continued to live in the city, where he died on 20 October 2015.

Honours
Benfica
Primeira Liga:1954–55

References
General
 

Specific

External links

1928 births
2015 deaths
Cape Verdean expatriate footballers
Cape Verdean footballers
Portuguese footballers
Association football forwards
Primeira Liga players
S.L. Benfica footballers
Lusitano G.C. players
Cape Verdean emigrants to Portugal